Aleksei Nikolayevich Mikhalyov (born 18 September 1983) is a Russian professional football official and a former player.

Club career
He played 4 seasons in the Russian Football National League for FC Vityaz Podolsk, FC Fakel Voronezh and FC Tambov.

External links
 
 

1983 births
Footballers from Tambov
Living people
Russian footballers
FC Spartak Tambov players
FC Fakel Voronezh players
FC Vityaz Podolsk players
Association football defenders
FC Sibir Novosibirsk players
FC Tambov players
FC Avangard Kursk players
FC Sportakademklub Moscow players